SandyGeorgia (Talk)  00:20, 17 March 2023 (UTC)